Wonganoo or Wonganoo Station is a pastoral lease that currently operates as a cattle station and had previously operated as a sheep station.

It is watered by two permanent springs, numerous soaks and 64 bores. Other improvements include four bedroom homestead, a two bedroom cottage and five bedroom workers quarters. The property has four sets of stockyards also boasts an aircraft hangar. It was advertised for sale at 2.5 million.

The Boladeras family acquired Wonganoo in 1925 with it being in partnership between the two Boladeras brothers. 

Malcolm Boladeras commenced running the station in 1979 after taking over from his father. By 2000 large packs of feral dogs were attacking the sheep and reduced the flock size from 9,000 to 2,000 in one year. Boladeras hired a shooter in an attempt to control the dog population but by 2004 was making the change to cattle.

See also
List of ranches and stations

References

Pastoral leases in Western Australia
Stations (Australian agriculture)
Mid West (Western Australia)